Mintimer Sharipovich Shaimiev (Shaymiyev, ; ; born January 20, 1937) is a Russian former politician who served as the president of Tatarstan from 1991 to 2010. He was re-elected president in 1996, 2001, and 2005.

Biography
Shaimiev was born in the village of Anyakovo, in Aktanyshsky District of the Tatar ASSR. He graduated from the Kazan Agricultural Institute in 1959, and worked as an agricultural engineer. He joined the Communist Party in 1963. In 1967 he was an instructor and deputy head of the agricultural department at Tatarstan's regional party organization. In 1969 Shaimiev was appointed Minister for Amelioration and Water Economy of his republic and in 1983 he became the first deputy chair of the Tatar Council of Ministers. In September 1989 Shaimiev became first secretary of Tatarstan's Communist Party organization.  In the same year he was elected to the Congress of Peoples's Deputies. In April 1990 he was elected speaker of Tatarstan's Supreme Soviet. On August 31, 1990, the Supreme Soviet proclaimed the sovereignty of Tatarstan.

President of Tatarstan 
On June 12, 1991, Shaimiev was elected President of the Tatar Soviet Socialist Republic and as President issued a declaration during the attempted coup of August 1991 in Moscow supporting the position of the Emergency Committee.  In March 1992 he held a referendum on Tatarstan's sovereignty during which 62 percent of the voters cast their ballots in favor of sovereignty. That year, his first state visit outside the country was to Kazakhstan, where he was received by President Nursultan Nazarbayev with honors.

Saying that he wanted to make way for a new generation of leadership—in accordance with a call from President Dmitry Medvedev—Shaimiev told Medvedev in January 2010 that he did not want to be nominated for another term as President of Tatarstan. He said that Rustam Minnikhanov, the Prime Minister of Tatarstan, was his preferred successor. Medvedev then nominated Minnikhanov to succeed Shaimiev on January 27, 2010.

Other ventures 
In 2001, he and Moscow's Mayor Yuri Luzhkov founded the United Russia party. He became State Counselor of Republic of Tatarstan shortly after resignation. Also he works as chairman of "Yanarysh" Foundation.

Honours and awards
 Order of Lenin (1966)
 Order of the October Revolution (1976)
 Order of the Red Banner of Labour (1971)
 Order of Friendship of Peoples (1987)
 Order of Merit for the Fatherland;
 1st class (January 20, 2007) – for outstanding contribution to strengthening Russian statehood, and socio-economic development
 2nd class (January 17, 1997) – for his great personal contribution to strengthening and development of Russian statehood, friendship and cooperation between nations
 3rd class (February 6, 2010) – for outstanding contribution to the socio-economic development of the long and diligent work
 4th class (January 14, 2014) 
 PM pistol award (January 20, 2002)
 Sword inscribed "East" (a replica of Iranian sabre "Shamshir" of the 16th century)
 Diploma of the President of the Russian Federation (December 12, 2008) – for active participation in the drafting of the Constitution and a great contribution to the democratic foundations of the Russian Federation
 Order "For merits before Republic of Tatarstan" (2010)
 Order "Honor and Glory", 2nd class (Abkhazia, 2003) – for his significant contribution to strengthening peace and friendly relations in the Caucasus and the active help and support for Abkhazia
 Order of Holy Prince Daniel of Moscow, 1st class (Russian Orthodox Church, 1997)
 Order of St. Sergius, 1st class (Russian Orthodox Church, 2005)
 Breastplate of the Foreign Ministry of Russia "for contribution to international cooperation" (2007)
 Diploma of the Government of the Russian Federation (1997)
 State Prize for peace and progress of the First President of the Republic of Kazakhstan (2005)
 Honorary Citizen of Kazan (2005)
 Order of Honour "Al-Fahr", 1st class (June 2005)
 International Prize of King Faisal (Saudi Arabia) – "for his contribution to the revival of Islamic culture" (2007)
 Honorary Member of the Russian Academy of Arts
 Olympic Order (2008) – "for his outstanding contribution to the development of the Olympic movement."
 Order of Friendship, 1st class (Kazakhstan, 2010)

References

External links

 Official website of Mintimer Shaimiev

1937 births
Living people
Heads of Tatarstan
Tatar politicians
Volga Tatar people
Prime Ministers of Tatarstan
Members of the Federation Council of Russia (1994–1996)
Members of the Federation Council of Russia (1996–2000)
People from Aktanyshsky District
Communist Party of the Soviet Union members
Full Cavaliers of the Order "For Merit to the Fatherland"
Recipients of the Order of Lenin
Recipients of the Order of Friendship of Peoples
Recipients of the Order of Holy Prince Daniel of Moscow
Recipients of the Olympic Order
United Russia politicians
21st-century Russian politicians
Honorary Members of the Russian Academy of Arts
Russian Sunni Muslims
Tatar people of Russia
Russian political party founders